Gordon W. Bowie (May 31, 1944 – January 5, 2012), bass trombonist, composer and conductor, was director of the Montgomery Village Community Band in Montgomery County, Maryland. He was bass trombonist for the Virginia Grand Military Band, Legacy Brass and other DC area ensembles. In addition, for the 1999-2000 school year he served as band and orchestra director for St. Stephen’s and St. Agnes Schools in Alexandria, Virginia.

Dr. Bowie was for many years Principal and Bass Trombonist of the Bangor Symphony Orchestra, a post which he left in September, 1997, to relocate to the Washington, DC, area. In his position with the Bangor Symphony, he garnered more than thirty years' orchestral experience under four music directors and numerous guest conductors, playing the standard orchestral repertoire.

For the twelve years from 1985 through 1997 he was also Conductor of the Bangor Band, a semi-professional New England Town Band said to be the second oldest continuous community band in the nation. One hundred-thirty-eight years old in the summer of 1997, the Bangor Band under Dr. Bowie performed year around with a mixed repertoire including band classics, overtures and transcriptions as well as popular tunes, movies and show music, patriotic music and Dixieland. A specialty of the Bangor Band under Dr. Bowie was the music of R.B. Hall, Maine's own march composer who was a contemporary of John Philip Sousa.

Dr. Bowie earned a BA (Music) from Colby College, MMED (Winds and Percussion) from the University of Colorado, and Ph.D. (Music) from the University of Maine, where the subject of his dissertation was R.B. Hall and the Community Bands of Maine. He taught music and bands at all levels, elementary through college, including seven years at Colby College in Waterville, Maine, where he was band director. He was Trombone Instructor at the University of Maine at Augusta during 1996 and 1997.

His many compositions include pieces for band, trombone, string orchestra, brass ensembles, and a large variety of other chamber music. He was a performing arts copyright specialist for the Library of Congress, as well as founder of Serendipity Press, a publisher of brass and woodwind solo and ensemble music with nationwide distribution.

He died on January 5, 2012, after a long struggle with prostate cancer.

References 

American conductors (music)
American male conductors (music)
American classical trombonists
American male classical composers
American classical composers
University of Maine at Augusta faculty
2012 deaths
1944 births
Place of birth missing
People from Montgomery County, Maryland
Colby College alumni
University of Colorado alumni
University of Maine alumni